This is a list of United Nations Security Council Resolutions 1101 to 1200 adopted between 28 March 1997 and 30 September 1998.

See also 
 Lists of United Nations Security Council resolutions
 List of United Nations Security Council Resolutions 1001 to 1100
 List of United Nations Security Council Resolutions 1201 to 1300

1101